Dada Sahib is a 2000 Malayalam-language action-drama film co-written and directed by Vinayan and starring Mammootty in dual role. He played the roles of Dada Sahib, an old freedom fighter of the Indian independence movement and Abubacker, an army man and patriot. The film was one of the highest grossing films of the year. Sai Kumar, Murali, Rajan P Dev, Babu Namboothiri, Kalabhavan Mani, Cochin Haneefa, K. B. Ganesh Kumar, Madhupal and Mohan Sharma play other pivotal roles.

Plot
Dada Mohammed Sahib, popularly known as Dada Sahib, is a freedom fighter and a former officer with the INA who always strives for the welfare of people, and the country is more than anything to him. His only son Subedar Abubacker  is in jail, awaiting his death sentence. He is accused of disloyalty towards his country in the name of Pakistan and for killing hundreds of people in the Thaliyoor temple. Heartbroken Sahib meets Governor Rahmath Ali  in order to get a final chance to rescue his son. But the governor informs Sahib that he couldn't do anything as Abubacker's death sentence is declared, and even the Supreme Court of India had rejected the mercy petition. Sahib then goes to jail to meet Abu and gives him a strong motivation that he should die only with the spirit of a true Indian. Afterwards Sahib confronts IG Skariah Zacharia, a cunning police officer who tells Sahib that he and his son are fighting for Pakistan and they are showing disloyalty to India. On reaching home, Sahib reveals his past to his right hand man Raghavan.

At Lahore, during the turbulent and hysterical days of  Partition, he put up a brave fight against communally motivated Muslims who targeted thousands of Hindus - as part of the communal pogrom that engulfed British India. After a long fight, Sahib threatens the leader of the Muslim gang. Hindus thank him for saving their lives and he is praised and celebrated as a hero.

Back to the present, doctor Raveendran discloses his pain to Das, a sincere and heartful police officer, of losing his wife in the bomb blast of Thaliyoor temple. Then comes Athira, who loves Abu, to see him for the last time. She, too is heartbroken to know that Abu is awaiting his death sentence. As the time for his hanging was nearby, all the ones who knew his innocence were in tears, including Athira. However, the story takes a turn as Abu escapes from the death miraculously. On reaching the hospital, Sahib is seen relieved and happy of getting his son back. Raveendran and Dr. John were the ones who had rescued Abu from death. A newspaper reporter Ravi takes some photos of Sahib and Abu. Eager to publish it and accusing him for another death sentence, he learns the truth from Raveendran when Abu recalls a past where Minister Mohammed Kutty was one of the reasons behind the explosion that happened at the temple. He teams up with Skariah and Swami Atmaswaroopan, an evil terrorist, to perform several other explosions in India as per the instruction of their leader 'Supper', who was the main hand behind these explosions. After killing hundreds in the temple, Skariah and Atmaswaroopan accused Abu for the same.

In the present day, Sahib and Abu learn about Supper. So they both set out to find the mysterious Supper. However, Skariah and Mohammed Kutty now doubt that Abu is still alive. Afterwards Athira, who is extremely happy, goes from her town to love with him. She goes with Raveendran. But on the way, Raveendran is killed, and Athira is taken to Mohammed Kutty's and Atmaswaroopan's custody to know if Abu is alive or not but in vain. Later they take Sahib and bind him to find the truth. Abu then rushes to the place and fights Mohammed Kutty and the gang. Between the fight, he came to see Athira being raped and killed. In a fit of anger, Abu kills Atmaswaroopan, and then he kills Skariah, who reveals that Mohammed Kutty only knew 'Supper'.

The next day all are celebrating 50th Republic Day of India in a large stadium where again an explosion is planned by Supper and Mohammed Kutty. Abu comes to the spot after making Mohammed Kutty defuse the bombs. All the people present there including the Chief Minister of Kerala, are shocked to see Abu alive. Then from Mohammed Kutty, it is revealed that Supper is none other than Governor Rahmath Ali, who was Sahib's close friend's son. After a long attempt to kill Abu, Sahib comes with a sword and threatens Rahmath Ali. The Chief Minister warned Sahib not to kill a Governor, and if the accusation comes true, the law will take actions. However, Sahib didn't listen to the Chief Minister's words and decided to kill Rahmat Ali after advising them about the importance of unity and strength in fighting for India. The soldiers shoot Sahib ruthlessly, and Abu is shocked on seeing that. However, Sahib musters up strength and beheads Rahmath Ali and dies at the spot. Subedar Abubacker is praised by Indian citizens.

Cast

Release
The film was released in December 2000.

Box office
The film was commercial success.

Soundtrack 
The film's soundtrack contains six songs, all composed by Mohan Sithara, with lyrics by
Yusufali Kecheri.

References

External links
 

2000s Malayalam-language films
2000 films
Indian action drama films
Indian vigilante films
Indian Army in films
Films scored by Mohan Sithara
Films directed by Vinayan
2000 action drama films